Prato is a city and comune in Tuscany, Italy, the capital of the Province of Prato. With 195,213 inhabitants , Prato is Tuscany's second largest city (after Florence) and the third largest in Central Italy (after Rome and Florence).

Historically, Prato's economy has been based on the textile industry and its district is the largest in Europe. The textile district of Prato is made up of about 7000 fashion companies, amounting to around 2 billion euros of city's export. The renowned Datini archives are a significant collection of late medieval documents concerning economic and trade history, produced between 1363 and 1410.

The city boasts important historical and artistic attractions, with a cultural span that started with the Etruscans and then expanded in the Middle Ages and reached its peak with the Renaissance, when artists such as Donatello, Filippo Lippi and Botticelli left their testimonies in the city.
The famous cantucci, a type of biscotti invented in Prato during the Middle Ages, are still produced by local traditional bakers.

History

Ancient times 
Archaeological findings have proved that Prato's surrounding hills were inhabited since Paleolithic times. The plain was later colonized by the Etruscans. In 1998 remains of a previously unknown city from that civilization were discovered in the neighbourhood of Gonfienti near Campi Bisenzio. It was of medium size and it was already a centre for the wool and textile industry. According to some scholars, it could be the mythical Camars. The Etruscan city was inhabited until the 5th century BC, when, for undisclosed reasons, it decayed; control of the area later shifted to the Romans, who had their Via Cassia pass through here, but did not build any settlement.

Middle Ages 
In the early Middle Ages, the Byzantine and Lombard dominations prevailed in the region.

The history of Prato itself begins from the 10th century, when two distinct villages, Borgo al Cornio and Castrum Prati (Prato's Castle), are known. In the following century the two settlements were united under the lords of the castle, the Alberti family, who received the imperial title of Counts of Prato. In the same period the plain was drained and a hydraulic system regulating and exploiting the waters of the Bisenzio River was created to feed the gualchiere (pre-industrial textile machines).

After a siege in 1107 by the troops of Matilde of Canossa, the Alberti retreated to their family fortresses in the Bisenzio Valley: Prato could therefore develop as a free commune. Within two centuries it reached 15,000 inhabitants, spurred in by the flourishing textile industry and by the presence of the Holy Belt relic. Two new lines of walls had to be built in the mid-12th century, and in the early 14th century.

In 1326, in order to counter the expansionism of the Republic of Florence, Prato submitted voluntarily under the seigniory of Robert of Anjou, King of Naples. However, on 23 February 1351 Joanna I of Naples sold the city to the Republic of Florence in exchange for 17,500 golden florins.

Prato's history therefore followed that of Florence in the following centuries.

Modern age 
In 1512, during the War of the Holy League, the city was sacked by Spanish troops assembled by Pope Julius II and the king of Aragón, Ferdinand II, to recover the nearby city of Florence for the Medici family. The severity of the sack of Prato led to the surrender of the Florentine Republic, and to the restoration of the Medici rule. Historians debate the actual number of people killed during the sack, but contemporary chroniclers asserted between 2000 and 6000 people were slaughtered in the streets.

In 1653 Prato obtained the status of city and became seat of a Catholic diocese. During the 18th century, with the ascent of Lorraine at the head of the Grand Duchy of Tuscany, the city was embellished and also experienced a significant cultural development, which was promoted by the grand dukes themselves.

The intellectual foresight of Prato and its land in this century finds its maximum expression in the words of Filippo Mazzei, a friend of Thomas Jefferson, which today are reported in the second paragraph of the Constitution of the United States of America: All men are created equal.

After the unification of Italy in the 19th century, Prato became a primary industrial centre, especially in the textile sector (Italian historian Emanuele Repetti described it as the "Italian Manchester"), and it population grew up to 50,000 in 1901 and to 180,000 in 2001. The town experienced significant internal immigration. Previously part of the province of Florence, in 1992 Prato became the capital of the eponymous province.

Climate
Prato has a humid subtropical climate which has sunny hot summers and cool damp winters. July is the driest month of the year.

Demographics

Chinese immigration 

The city of Prato has the second largest Chinese immigrant population in Italy (after Milan with Italy's largest Chinatown). The number of legal Chinese residents in Prato on 31 December 2008 was 9,927; the number raised to 27,829 on 31 December 2021. Local authorities estimate the overall number of Chinese citizens living in Prato to be as high as 50,000, illegal immigrants included, although such number may be inflated for political reasons. Most overseas Chinese come from the city of Wenzhou in the province of Zhejiang, some of them having moved from Chinatown in Paris. The first Chinese people came to Prato in the early 1990s. The majority of Chinese work in 3,500 workshops in the garment industry and ready-to-wear. Chinatown, known as Santo Beijing, is located in the west part of the city, spreading to Porta Pistoiese in the historical centre. The local Chamber of Commerce registered over 3,100 Chinese businesses by September 2008. Most of them are located in an industrial park named Macrolotto di Iolo. Raids on factories employing illegal immigrants in 2010 highlighted problems with the growth of an apparel industry in Prato based on cheap, and sometimes illegal, labor. In spite of all these blames, the local unemployment rate was around 7% in 2013, which was significantly lower than the national average 11%, even after 4,000 enterprises which employed 20,000 people were closed in the past two decades. The president of the Industrial Association of Prato, Andrea Cavicchi, pointed out that the local economic performance was much better than the rest of Italy due to those Chinese textile business.

, the Italian and Chinese populations did not socially mix. As of that year, there were 30,000 legal Chinese immigrants, and authorities believed there was a similar number of illegal Chinese immigrants.

Dialect 
The dialect from Prato is very similar to that of Florence, but it has its own peculiarities.

Government

Culture

Corteggio Storico 
On 8 September each year, to pay homage to the Sacra Cintola, on the day of the birth of the Madonna, there is the Corteggio Storico. The costume parade takes place along the streets of the center, in which the armies of the city, the Corpo dei Valletti Comunali and other hundreds of people from different cities of Italy take part. The procession ends in Piazza del Duomo, where there is the most solemn event of the day: the exposition of the relic of the Holy Girdle.

The program of the festival is enriched by various performances that are held throughout the day in various points of the historic center, such as, for example, the performance of flag-wavers, shooting with bows, the medieval market with re-enactments of ancient crafts and traditions, musical performances, fireworks.

Palla Grossa 
The Game of Palla Grossa is back to be played in Prato Piazza Mercatale in September 2012, after almost thirty years of absence. Four districts compete: the Rossi (Santa Trinita), the Gialli (Santo Stefano), the Azzurri (Santa Maria) and the Verdi (San Marco).

Contemporary festival 
The contemporanea festival is an international theater festival that takes place in Prato since 1999. The event takes place at the end of May and presents important artists of the national and international contemporary theater scene.

Typical cuisine

The typical Pratese cuisine, as in general that of the whole Tuscany, uses "poor" products and ingredients, mainly from the territory.
The bread, called bozza pratese, is definitely the basic element of the kitchen. In Prato, as in Florence it is customary to use bread to prepare croutons with the livers, panzanella and pappa al pomodoro.

Piatti tipici
 Cantucci
 Bruttiboni
 Sedani ripieni alla pratese
 Mortadella di Prato
 Ribollita
 Torta mantovana
 Pesche di Prato
 Vermouth di Prato
 Zuccherini
 Bozza pratese

Music collections

Main sights
Prato is home to many museums and other cultural monuments, including the Filippo Lippi frescoes in the Cathedral of Santo Stefano, recently restored. The cathedral has an external pulpit by Donatello and Michelozzo, built and still used for the display of the cathedral's famous relic of the Virgin Mary, the Girdle of Thomas (Sacra Cintola, a cord belt), which had a great reputation in the late Middle Ages and is often shown in Florentine art.  Also of interest is the Teatro Metastasio, the city's main venue for operas and other theatrical productions, which was built in 1829–30.

Palazzi and castles in the historical center

Palazzo Pretorio The palace was begun in the 13th century in red bricks; late-Gothic style additions were in white stone. The external staircase and clock were added in the 16th century and later. 
Palazzo Datini Built from 1383 for the merchant Francesco Datini. It was decorated by Florentine artists like Agnolo Gaddi and Niccolò Gerini. In 1409 it housed Pope Alexander V and Louis of Anjou. 
Palazzo degli Alberti (13th Century), housing a museum with works by Filippo Lippi (Madonna del Ceppo), Giovanni Bellini (Crucifix with Jew Cemetery) and Caravaggio (The Crowning with Thorns).
Castello dell'Imperatore Located in the city center, this is the northernmost castle built by Frederick II of Hohenstaufen in Italy.

Main churches in the historical center 

 Prato Cathedral One of the most ancient churches in the city, already in existence in the 10th century. It was built in several successive stages in the Romanesque style. The church contains a number of notable works of art, in particular fine sculpture.
 Santa Maria delle Carceri Commissioned by Lorenzo de' Medici to Giuliano da Sangallo in 1484. It is on a Greek cross plan, inspired by Brunelleschi's Pazzi Chapel. Works lasted for some twenty years. The interior is run by a bichromatic maiolica frieze by Luca della Robbia, also author of four tondos depicting the four Evangelists in the cupola. The external façade is unfinished, only the western part being completed in the 19th century according to Sangallo's design.
 Sant'Agostino built from 1440 over an existing edifice from 1271. It has a simple façade with a rose window and a bell tower with pyramidal top. The interior is on the basilica plan, with a nave and two aisles divided by brickwork columns having "waterleave" capitals (c. 1410). The apse chapels date to the late 14th century. The interior is home to canvasses by Giovanni Battista Naldini, Lorenzo Lippi, l'Empoli, Giovanni Bizzelli and others, as well as 14th-century frescoes. The cloister dates to the 16th century.
San Domenico The interior altars house a crucifix of the 14th century and an Annunciation by Matteo Rosselli (1578–1650). The cloister of the adjacent convent was built in 1478–80. An adjacent museum has works of wall frescoes.
San Francesco It houses a funerary monument of Geminiano Inghirami (died 1460), and the frescoes by Niccolò Gerini in the wonderful Cappella Migliorati. 
 San Fabiano Already existing in 1082. It houses precious traces of a pavement mosaic dating from the 9th–11th centuries. Also notable is the 15th-century bell tower.
 Minor Basilica of Santi Vicenzo e Caterina de' Ricci Adjacent to the late-Baroque monastery of San Vicenzo. The church was decorated for the canonization of the Saint Catherine of Ricci, who was associated with the monastery and is buried in the church.

Main museums
 Palazzo Pretorio It was the old city hall located town center, standing in front of the current Palazzo Comunale. It now accommodates the Civic Museum of Prato, which was reopened in September 2013.
 Prato Cathedral Museum It was founded in 1967 in a few rooms of the Bishop's residence and in 1976 grew to include items from both the Cathedral of Saint Stephen and the diocesan territory.

 Centro per l'arte contemporanea Luigi Pecci Devoted to the contemporary arts of the last three decades. The complex composes the Museum of Contemporary Art, the Centre of Information and Documentation, including the visual arts, and an education department.
 Prato textile museum The museum and library is an Anchor point on the European Route of Industrial Heritage.
 Galleria di Palazzo degli Alberti Home to the art gallery of the local bank (former Cassa di Risparmio di Prato). Works of the collection include The Crowning with Thorns, by Caravaggio (c. 1604).
 Museo della Deportazione Dedicated to the history of Fascism's occurrence and rise to power in Italy.

Sport
Rugby Club I Cavalieri Prato
A.C. Prato

Transportation

Train 

The city of Prato is crossed by two railway lines: the Viareggio-Florence Railroad and the Bologna-Florence Railways. The first is a regional line that connects it with Florence and western Tuscany, while the second is part of the Milan-Naples ridge and is one of the most important Italian railway lines. Prato is therefore served by some long-distance trains.

There are three railway stations in the city:

 Prato Porta al Serraglio railway station is situated in the historical center of the town and connects to Florence in about 25 minutes by the Viareggio–Florence railway.
 Prato Centrale railway station was opened in 1862 and is the largest station in Prato. It is part of Bologna–Florence railway and Viareggio–Florence railway.
 Prato Borgonuovo Station

Highways 
 Motorway A11 (Firenze-Mare): Prato is served by A11 motorway through two toll stations: Prato Est and Prato Ovest.
 Motorway A1 (Milano-Napoli): Prato is served by A1 motorway through one toll station: Calenzano.

Buses
Consorzio Autotrasporti Pratese, also known CAP Autolinee, was a Società consortile a responsabilità limitata (Scarl) that operated since 2005 the local public transport in Prato and in the province and partly in that of Pistoia and Florence. The sole partner is Cap Cooperativa, whose members are also workers who cover the positions of travelling driving personnel. There are a total of 11 active routes, including five LAMs (LAM Blu, LAM Rossa, LAM Arancio, LAM Viola, LAM-MT)  that connect the city center, the surrounding areas and the suburbs with frequencies ranging from seven to fifteen minutes. CAP Autolinee was part of ONE Scarl the consortium holder of the two-year (2018-2019) contract for the management of the TPL throughout the Region.

Since 1 November 2021 the public local transport is managed by Autolinee Toscane.

Education 

The main points of reference are the University Campus of Prato (a branch of the Università degli Studi di Firenze) and the Prato Research Foundation which also includes the Istituto Geofisico Toscano, in addition to the creation of a Research Center financed by local authorities and the Chamber of Commerce.

Italian Universities 
From the first nineties the city is home to an important university center with over 2000 registered students, called "University Campus of Prato", born from the collaboration between the University of Florence and a consortium company born from the collaboration between local authorities (first of all the Municipality of Prato) and various private subjects, the PIN Scrl, owner of the building (formerly the prestigious Istituto T. Buzzi and renovated for the occasion) which houses the polo. Some courses of study are underway at the faculty of economics, letters and philosophy, engineering, medicine and surgery and political sciences of the Florentine university.

Foreign Universities 
Monash University, Australia has an office in Palazzo Vai that opened in September 2001.
University of New Haven, US opened a satellite campus in the fall of 2012.
Beacon College, US began a Prato study abroad program the fall of 2017.

High schools 
 Cosimo Bellini Institutes
 Conservatory of San Niccolò
 Cicognini, State National Boarding School
 Liceo Scientifico / Linguistico Statale "Carlo Livi"
 Liceo Scientifico / Linguistico Statale "Niccolò Copernico"
 Liceo Artistico Statale "Umberto Brunelleschi"
 "F. Cicognini" Classical High School
 Liceo Socio Psycho-pedagogical and Social Sciences "Gianni Rodari"
 State Institute of Higher Education "A. Gramsci – J.M. Keynes"
 Tullio Buzzi State Technical Industrial Institute
 Paolo Dagomari State Technical Commercial Institute
 Istituto Tecnico Agrario e Professionale Alberghiero di Stato "Francesco Datini"
 State Professional Institute for Industry and Crafts

Notable people

 Nicolò Albertini, 13th-century cardinal
 Lorenzo Bartolini, sculptor
 Sem Benelli, writer
 Roberto Benigni, actor and director
 Francesca Bertini, actress
 Antonio Brunelli, composer
 Clara Calamai, actress
 Ferdinando Castagnoli, archaeologist
 Jury Chechi, gymnast, Olympic gold medalist
 Compagnetto da Prato, medieval poet
 Enrico Coveri, fashion designer and entrepreneur
 Lorenzo Dalla Porta, motorcycle racer
 Francesco Datini, 14th-century merchant
 Alessandro Diamanti, soccer player
 Ignazio Fresu, sculptor
 Emilia Goggi, opera singer
 Filippino Lippi, 15th-century painter
 Fiorenzo Magni, cyclist
 Curzio Malaparte, writer
 Filippo Mazzei, politician
 Giovanni Nesi, pianist
 Francesco Nuti, actor
 Iva Pacetti, lyric singer(soprano)
 Gianni Pedrizzetti, engineer and professor
 Rachele Risaliti, Miss Italia 2016
 Paolo Rossi, soccer player
 Christian Vieri, soccer player
 Pamela Villoresi, actress
 Domenico Zipoli, composer

Twin towns – sister cities

Prato is twinned with:

 Albemarle County, United States (1977)
 Bir Lehlou, Western Sahara  (1985)
 Changzhou, China (1987)
 Ebensee am Traunsee, Austria (1987)
 Nam Dinh, Vietnam (1975)
 Roubaix, France (1981)
 Sarajevo, Bosnia and Herzegovina (1997)
 Wangen im Allgäu, Germany (1988)

See also 
 Cantucci
 Filippino Lippi
 Palazzo Pretorio, Prato
 Prato Cathedral Museum
 Prato Cathedral

References

Bibliography

External links

 Prato Turismo
 City of Prato
 Exhibition Da Donatello a Lippi. Officina Pratese at Museo Civico di Palazzo Pretorio in Prato (September 2013 – January 2014)
 Information about Prato, Free Time Guide on Prato 
 Complete Image galleries of the town, the medieval historic centre, churches and the Chinese quarter 
 Chinese Remake the 'Made in Italy' Fashion Label
 A City Transformed – slideshow by The New York Times
 Prato on Encyclopædia Britannica

 
10th-century establishments in Italy
Cities and towns in Tuscany
Populated places established in the 10th century